Substituted cathinones, which include some stimulants and entactogens, are derivatives of cathinone. They feature a phenethylamine core with an alkyl group attached to the alpha carbon, and a ketone group attached to the beta carbon, along with additional substitutions. Cathinone occurs naturally in the plant khat whose leaves are chewed as a recreational drug.

List of substituted cathinones 
The derivatives may be produced by substitutions at four locations of the cathinone molecule:
 R1 = hydrogen, or any combination of one or more alkyl, alkoxy, alkylenedioxy, haloalkyl or halide substituents
 R2 = hydrogen or any alkyl group
 R3 = hydrogen, any alkyl group, or incorporation in a cyclic structure
 R4 = hydrogen, any alkyl group, or incorporation in a cyclic structure

The following table displays notable derivatives that have been reported:

Legality
On 2 April 2010, the Advisory Council on the Misuse of Drugs in the UK announced that a broad structure-based ban of this entire class of compounds would be instituted, following extensive publicity around grey-market sales and recreational use of mephedrone, a common member of the family. This ban covers compounds with the aforementioned general structure, with 28 compounds specifically named.

This text was added as an amendment to the Misuse of Drugs Act 1971, to come into force on 16 April 2010. Note that four of the above compounds (cathinone, methcathinone, diethylpropion and pyrovalerone) were already illegal in the UK at the time the ACMD report was issued. Two compounds were specifically excluded from the ban, these being bupropion because of its common use in medicine and relative lack of abuse potential, and naphyrone because its structure falls outside the generic definition and not enough evidence was yet available to justify a ban.

Naphyrone analogues were subsequently banned in July 2010 following a further review by the ACMD, along with a further broad based structure ban even more expansive than the last.

The substitutions in the general structure for naphyrone analogues subject to the ban may be described as follows:
 Cyc = any monocyclic, or fused-polycyclic ring system (not being a phenyl ring or alkylenedioxyphenyl ring system), including analogues where the ring system is substituted to any extent with alkyl, alkoxy, haloalkyl or halide substituents, whether or not further substituted in the ring system by one or more other univalent substituents
 R1 = hydrogen or any alkyl group
 R2 = hydrogen, any alkyl group, or incorporation in a cyclic structure
 R3 = hydrogen, any alkyl group, or incorporation in a cyclic structure

More new derivatives have however continued to appear, with the UK reporting more novel cathinone derivatives detected in 2010 than any other country in Europe, with most of them first identified after the generic ban had gone into effect and thus already being illegal despite never having been previously reported.

In the United States, substituted cathinones are the psychoactive ingredients in "bath salts" which as of July 2011 were banned by at least 28 states, but not by the federal government.

See also 
 Markush structure
 Substituted amphetamines
 Substituted methylenedioxyphenethylamines
 Substituted phenethylamines
 Substituted phenylmorpholines
 Structural scheduling of synthetic cannabinoids
 Arylcyclohexylamines
 List of aminorex analogues
 List of fentanyl analogues
 List of methylphenidate analogues

References 

Chemical classes of psychoactive drugs
Cathinones